Vania King (born February 3, 1989) is an American former tennis player. A former top-ten doubles player, King won both the Wimbledon and US Open women's doubles titles in 2010 with partner Yaroslava Shvedova, with whom she also reached the final of the 2011 US Open. She won a total of 15 WTA doubles titles and reached a career-high ranking of No. 3 in the world. She also ended runner-up in the mixed-doubles final at the French Open in 2009, with Marcelo Melo.

In singles, King has been ranked as high as No. 50 in the world. Her biggest accomplishments included a WTA Tour title at the 2006 Bangkok Open and two runner-up finishes at the 2013 Guangzhou International and 2016 Jianxi International. She also progressed as far as the third round in Grand Slam tournaments, doing so on four occasions (the 2009 US Open, the 2011 French Open, the 2011 US Open, and the 2012 Australian Open).

King announced her retirement on April 6, 2021

Personal life
King's parents moved to the United States from Taiwan in 1982. She is the youngest of four children. Her brother Phillip was a two-time All-American at Duke University and two-time US junior champion. Vania is a graduate of Long Beach Poly High School in California.

Tennis career

2006–2009
In 2006, King won her only WTA Tour singles title at the Bangkok Open, a Tier-III tournament where she defeated Tamarine Tanasugarn in the final. In November, she achieved her career-high singles ranking of world No. 50.

In 2009, she reached the mixed-doubles final at the French Open alongside Brazilian player Marcelo Melo, losing to top-seeded team Liezel Huber/Bob Bryan.

King lost in the second round of the 2009 Wimbledon Championships to No. 15, Flavia Pennetta. She played in the ladies' doubles with Anna-Lena Grönefeld, losing in the quarterfinals to eventual champions Venus and Serena Williams.

At the US Open, King was granted a wildcard and had her best singles Grand Slam performance. She was defeated in the third round by world No. 22, Daniela Hantuchová.

2010
King began the year ranked No. 80 in the world at the Brisbane International. She reached the second round of the singles tournament, losing to Andrea Petkovic. In doubles, she partnered with Anna-Lena Grönefeld and lost in the first round to Timea Bacsinszky and Tathiana Garbin. King and Grönefeld fared better at the Sydney International, where they were seeded fourth. They lost in the semifinals to Garbin and Nadia Petrova. In the singles tournament, King failed to qualify, losing in the first round of the qualifying tournament to top seed Ágnes Szávay, who went on to defeat Jelena Janković in the first round of the tournament.

At the Australian Open, King lost in the second round to Roberta Vinci. In doubles, she partnered with Grönefeld again and entered the tournament seeded 14th. They lost in the second round to Svetlana Kuznetsova and Victoria Azarenka.

King's next bigger tournament was the Memphis Cup in mid-February. She entered the singles draw seeded seventh and lost in the second round to Sofia Arvidsson. In the doubles tournament, she and partner Michaëlla Krajicek were seeded third and won the title without dropping a set, defeating Bethanie Mattek-Sands and Shaughnessy in the final.

King then traveled to the Monterrey Open. In doubles, she reunited with Grönefeld and reached the final as the top seed, falling to second-seeded pair Benešová/Záhlavová. In singles, she lost in the quarterfinals to second seed Daniela Hantuchová.
At the Indian Wells Open, King lost in the second round to No. 2, Caroline Wozniacki. She did not enter the doubles tournament. She fared better in the Miami Open later that month. King partnered with Julie Coin and reached the quarterfinals of the doubles tournament, before losing to third seeds Petrova and Samantha Stosur, who went on to become the runners-up.

Her next Premier event was the Charleston Open, where she reunited with Krajicek and reached the final, before falling to top seeds Huber and Petrova. In singles, she lost to Petrova in the second round.
At the Madrid Open, King paired with Chuang Chia-jung for the first time for the doubles tournament. They defeated fourth seeds Huber and Anabel Medina Garrigues, before falling in the quarterfinals to Pe'er and Francesca Schiavone. In singles, King lost in the first round to Karolina Šprem.
She then entered the Strasbourg International. In the doubles tournament, she partnered with Alizé Cornet and won the title after an injury to Lucie Hradecká forced top seeds Hradecká/Chuang to retire in the second round. King/Cornet defeated second seeds Rodionova/Kudryavtseva in the final for her tenth tour doubles title. In singles, King defeated second seed Elena Vesnina in the first round and reached the semifinals, falling there to Kristina Barrois.

At the French Open, she lost in the first round to Mattek-Sands. She entered the mixed-doubles tournament with Christopher Kas, reaching the semifinals, before falling to Shvedova and Julian Knowle. In women's doubles with Krajicek, she reached the second round losing to fourth-seeded Petrova and Stosur.

At Wimbledon, King won the ladies' doubles title in straight sets with Yaroslava Shvedova. They defeated Elena Vesnina and Vera Zvonareva in the final.
At the US Open, King and Shvedova won their second Grand Slam doubles title, defeating the second-seeded pair Huber/Petrova in a rain-delayed final.
At the Stanford Classic, Vania lost to Sorana Cîrstea.

2011
King and Shvedova made the finals of the US Open, losing to Liezel Huber and Lisa Raymond.

King made it to the finals of five other WTA tournaments in the course of the year, one in Monterrey with Grönefeld and in Rome, Cincinnati, Osaka, and Moscow with Shvedova. She and Shvedova won the events in Cincinnati in August and Moscow in October.

2012
King reached the third round of the Australian Open at the start of the year, losing to Ana Ivanovic. She had defeated Kateryna Bondarenko in the first round.

She reached the second round of the Carlsbad Open in July, losing to Marion Bartoli.

In doubles, she reached the final in Stanford with Jarmila Gajdošová and in Carlsbad with Nadia Petrova, but lost to Marina Erakovic and Heather Watson in Stanford and to Raquel Kops-Jones and Abigail Spears in Carlsbad.

2013

In singles action, King lost in the Guangzhou final to Zhang Shuai. King lost in the second round of the French Open and in the first round of the other three Slans. In doubles that year, her best finish was a finals loss in Guangzhou.

2014
In doubles, King made the second round at the Australian Open partnering Galina Voskoboeva. They lost to the Czech/Dutch pair of Hradecká and Krajicek.

She partnered with Barbora Strýcová in Florianópolis, and they made it to the semifinals before being defeated by Medina Garrigues and Shvedova. She was eliminated in the first round in Indian Wells, and the second round in Miami, but made it to the final in Bogotá, partnering Chanelle Scheepers of South Africa.

Partnering Zheng Jie, she made a quarterfinal appearance in Madrid, losing to Sara Errani and Roberta Vinci. Then followed a series of first-round losses, including Roland Garros and Wimbledon.

She had some success in the late summer, making the quarterfinals in Washington, partnering Taylor Townsend, and the third round at the US Open, partnering Lisa Raymond.

In singles, she made the semifinals in Shenzhen, but had to concede a walkover. She made a first-round exit at the Australian Open at the hands of Carla Suárez Navarro. At the Pattaya Open, she was defeated by Elena Vesnina in the first round. A series of first-round defeats followed in Rio de Janeiro, Florianópolis, and Indian Wells.

She made the second round in Miami and Charleston, but it was not until April in Bogotá that she found some form and made it to the semifinals. She went down in the first round in both Roland Garros and Wimbledon, but she did make the quarterfinals in Washington, D.C.

At the US Open, she defeated Francesca Schiavone in the first round, but lost to eventual champion Serena Williams in the second.

2015
King missed the first three majors of 2015 due to injury. She lost in the first round of singles and the second round of doubles there in Flushing. The highlight of her year came on hardcourts in Waco, where King and Nicole Gibbs won in November, defeating Julia Glushko and Rebecca Peterson.

2017
King reunited in 2017 with the doubles partner with whom she had had the most success, Yaroslava Shvedova. They made it to the semifinals in Sydney where they lost to Sania Mirza and Barbora Strýcová.

At the Australian Open, King and Shvedova advanced to the third round, where they lost to Mirjana Lučić-Baroni and Andrea Petkovic. They were stopped in the second round of Indian Wells by the Japanese/Chinese pair of Shuko Aoyama and Yang Zhaoxuan. In Miami, they went on to the quarterfinals, where they again lost to Mirza and Strýcová.

Performance timelines

Singles

Doubles

Mixed doubles

Significant finals

Grand Slam tournaments

Doubles: 3 (2 titles, 1 runner-up)

Mixed doubles: 1 (runner-up)

WTA 1000 finals

Doubles: 4 (2 titles, 2 runner-ups)

WTA career finals

Singles: 3 (1 title, 2 runner-ups)

Doubles: 33 (15 titles, 18 runner-ups)

WTA 125 tournament finals

Doubles: 1 (runner-up)

ITF Circuit finals

Singles: 2 (runner–ups)

Doubles: 8 (7 titles, 1 runner–up)

Junior Grand Slam finals

Doubles: 1 (runner-up)

References

External links

 
 
 

American female tennis players
American sportswomen of Chinese descent
Duke Blue Devils women's tennis players
Sportspeople from Los Angeles County, California
Tennis players from Long Beach, California
1989 births
Living people
Taiwanese-American tennis players
Grand Slam (tennis) champions in women's doubles
Wimbledon champions
US Open (tennis) champions
Long Beach Polytechnic High School alumni